International Islamic University Malaysia is a public university in Malaysia. The following is a list of notable alumni.

References